is a passenger railway station located in the city of  Kōka, Shiga, Japan operated by the third-sector Shigaraki Kohgen Railway.  The station name is derived from the ruins of Shigaraki Palace, located nearby.

Lines

Station layout
The station consists of one side platform serving single bi-directional track. There is no station building, and the station is unattended.

Adjacent stations

History
Shigarakigūshi Station opened on July 13, 1987.

Passenger statistics

Surrounding area
 Shigaraki Palace ruins
 Shigaraki Hospital
 Japan National Route 307
 Tokai Nature Trail

See also
List of railway stations in Japan

References

External links

Shigaraki Railway home page

Railway stations in Japan opened in 1987
Railway stations in Shiga Prefecture
Kōka, Shiga